Control engineering or control systems engineering is an engineering discipline that deals with control systems, applying control theory to design equipment and systems with desired behaviors in control environments. The discipline of controls overlaps and is usually taught along with electrical engineering and mechanical engineering at many institutions around the world.

The practice uses sensors and detectors to measure the output performance of the process being controlled; these measurements are used to provide corrective feedback helping to achieve the desired performance. Systems designed to perform without requiring human input are called automatic control systems (such as cruise control for regulating the speed of a car). Multi-disciplinary in nature, control systems engineering activities focus on implementation of control systems mainly derived by mathematical modeling of a diverse range of systems.

Overview
Modern day control engineering is a relatively new field of study that gained significant attention during the 20th century with the advancement of technology. It can be broadly defined or classified as practical application of control theory. Control engineering plays an essential role in a wide range of control systems, from simple household washing machines to high-performance F-16 fighter aircraft. It seeks to understand physical systems, using mathematical modelling, in terms of inputs, outputs and various components with different behaviors; to use control system design tools to develop controllers for those systems; and to implement controllers in physical systems employing available technology. A system can be mechanical, electrical, fluid, chemical, financial or biological, and its mathematical modelling, analysis and controller design uses control theory in one or many of the time, frequency and complex-s domains, depending on the nature of the design problem.

Control engineering is the engineering discipline that focuses on the modeling of a diverse range of dynamic systems (e.g. mechanical systems) and the design of controllers that will cause these systems to behave in the desired manner.  Although such controllers need not be electrical, many are and hence control engineering is often viewed as a subfield of electrical engineering.

Electrical circuits, digital signal processors and microcontrollers can all be used to implement control systems. Control engineering has a wide range of applications from the flight and propulsion systems of commercial airliners to the cruise control present in many modern automobiles.

In most cases, control engineers utilize feedback when designing control systems. This is often accomplished using a PID controller system. For example, in an automobile with cruise control the vehicle's speed is continuously monitored and fed back to the system, which adjusts the motor's torque accordingly. Where there is regular feedback, control theory can be used to determine how the system responds to such feedback. In practically all such systems stability is important and control theory can help ensure stability is achieved.

Although feedback is an important aspect of control engineering, control engineers may also work on the control of systems without feedback. This is known as open loop control. A classic example of open loop control is a washing machine that runs through a pre-determined cycle without the use of sensors.

History 

Automatic control systems were first developed over two thousand years ago. The first feedback control device on record is thought to be the ancient Ktesibios's water clock in Alexandria, Egypt, around the third century BCE. It kept time by regulating the water level in a vessel and, therefore, the water flow from that vessel. This certainly was a successful device as water clocks of similar design were still being made in Baghdad when the Mongols captured the city in 1258 CE. A variety of automatic devices have been used over the centuries to accomplish useful tasks or simply just to entertain. The latter includes the automata, popular in Europe in the 17th and 18th centuries, featuring dancing figures that would repeat the same task over and over again; these automata are examples of open-loop control. Milestones among feedback, or "closed-loop" automatic control devices, include the temperature regulator of a furnace attributed to Drebbel, circa 1620, and the centrifugal flyball governor used for regulating the speed of steam engines by James Watt in 1788.

In his 1868 paper "On Governors", James Clerk Maxwell was able to explain instabilities exhibited by the flyball governor using differential equations to describe the control system. This demonstrated the importance and usefulness of mathematical models and methods in understanding complex phenomena, and it signaled the beginning of mathematical control and systems theory. Elements of control theory had appeared earlier but not as dramatically and convincingly as in Maxwell's analysis.

Control theory made significant strides over the next century. New mathematical techniques, as well as advances in electronic and computer technologies, made it possible to control significantly more complex dynamical systems than the original flyball governor could stabilize. New mathematical techniques included developments in optimal control in the 1950s and 1960s followed by progress in stochastic, robust, adaptive, nonlinear control methods in the 1970s and 1980s. Applications of control methodology have helped to make possible space travel and communication satellites, safer and more efficient aircraft, cleaner automobile engines, and cleaner and more efficient chemical processes.

Before it emerged as a unique discipline, control engineering was practiced as a part of mechanical engineering and control theory was studied as a part of electrical engineering since electrical circuits can often be easily described using control theory techniques. In the very first control relationships, a current output was represented by a voltage control input. However, not having adequate technology to implement electrical control systems, designers were left with the option of less efficient and slow responding mechanical systems. A very effective mechanical controller that is still widely used in some hydro plants is the governor. Later on, previous to modern power electronics, process control systems for industrial applications were devised by mechanical engineers using pneumatic and hydraulic control devices, many of which are still in use today.

Control systems

Control theory

Education 
At many universities around the world, control engineering courses are taught primarily in electrical engineering and mechanical engineering, but some courses can be instructed in mechatronics engineering, and aerospace engineering. In others, control engineering is connected to computer science, as most control techniques today are implemented through computers, often as embedded systems (as in the automotive field). The field of control within chemical engineering is often known as process control. It deals primarily with the control of variables in a chemical process in a plant. It is taught as part of the undergraduate curriculum of any chemical engineering program and employs many of the same principles in control engineering. Other engineering disciplines also overlap with control engineering as it can be applied to any system for which a suitable model can be derived. However, specialised control engineering departments do exist, for example, in Italy there are several master in Automation & Robotics that are fully specialised in Control engineering or the Department of Automatic Control and Systems Engineering at the University of Sheffield  or the Department of Robotics and Control Engineering at the United States Naval Academy and the Department of Control and Automation Engineering at the Istanbul Technical University.

Control engineering has diversified applications that include science, finance management, and even human behavior.  Students of control engineering may start with a linear control system course dealing with the time and complex-s domain, which requires a thorough background in elementary mathematics and Laplace transform, called classical control theory.  In linear control, the student does frequency and time domain analysis.  Digital control and nonlinear control courses require Z transformation and algebra respectively, and could be said to complete a basic control education.

Careers 
A control engineer's career starts with a bachelor's degree and can continue through the college process. Control engineer degrees are well paired with an electrical or mechanical engineering degree. Control engineers usually get jobs in technical managing where they typically lead interdisciplinary projects. There are many job opportunities in aerospace companies, manufacturing companies, automobile companies, power companies, and government agencies. Some places that hire Control Engineers include companies such as Rockwell Automation, NASA, Ford, and Goodrich.  Control Engineers can possibly earn $66k annually from Lockheed Martin Corp. They can also earn up to $96k annually from General Motors Corporation.

According to a Control Engineering survey, most of the people who answered were control engineers in various forms of their own career. There are not very many careers that are classified as "control engineer," most of them are specific careers that have a small semblance to the overarching career of control engineering. A majority of the control engineers that took the survey in 2019 are system or product designers, or even control or instrument engineers. Most of the jobs involve process engineering or production or even maintenance, they are some variation of control engineering.

Recent advancement 

Originally, control engineering was all about continuous systems. Development of computer control tools posed a requirement of discrete control system engineering because the communications between the computer-based digital controller and the physical system are governed by a computer clock. The equivalent to Laplace transform in the discrete domain is the Z-transform. Today, many of the control systems are computer controlled and they consist of both digital and analog components.

Therefore, at the design stage either digital components are mapped into the continuous domain and the design is carried out in the continuous domain, or analog components are mapped into discrete domain and design is carried out there. The first of these two methods is more commonly encountered in practice because many industrial systems have many continuous systems components, including mechanical, fluid, biological and analog electrical components, with a few digital controllers.

Similarly, the design technique has progressed from paper-and-ruler based manual design to computer-aided design and now to computer-automated design or CAD which has been made possible by evolutionary computation. CAD can be applied not just to tuning a predefined control scheme, but also to controller structure optimisation, system identification and invention of novel control systems, based purely upon a performance requirement, independent of any specific control scheme.

Resilient control systems extend the traditional focus of addressing only planned disturbances to frameworks and attempt to address multiple types of unexpected disturbance; in particular, adapting and transforming behaviors of the control system in response to malicious actors, abnormal failure modes, undesirable human action, etc.

See also 

 Automation engineering
 Electrical engineering
 Communications engineering
 Satellite navigation
 Outline of control engineering
 Advanced process control
 Building automation
 Computer-automated design (CAutoD, CAutoCSD)
 Control reconfiguration
 Feedback
 H-infinity
 Lead–lag compensator
 List of control engineering topics
 Quantitative feedback theory
 Robotic unicycle
 State space
 Sliding mode control
 Systems engineering
 Testing controller
 VisSim
 Control Engineering (magazine)
 EICASLAB
 Time series
 Process control system
 Robotic control
 Mechatronics

References

Further reading

External links

Control Labs Worldwide
The Michigan Chemical Engineering Process Dynamics and Controls Open Textbook
Control System Integrators Association
List of control systems integrators
Institution of Mechanical Engineers - Mechatronics, Informatics and Control Group (MICG) 
Systems Science & Control Engineering: An Open Access Journal

 
Electrical engineering
Mechanical engineering
Systems engineering
Engineering disciplines